Alliance Soccer Laval (formerly CS Monteuil) is a Canadian semi-professional soccer club based in Laval, Quebec that plays in the Première Ligue de soccer du Québec. In 2021, CS Monteuil merged with youth club CS Étoiles de l’Est to form AS Laval.

History

CS Monteuil

The club was originally formed in 1966 under the name  l’Association sportive Monteuil de Laval.

In 2018, they entered a team in the women's division of the Première Ligue de soccer du Québec. In 2019, the women won the league, earning 33 points through 15 games to come in first place. In 2021, the club finished in second place in both the league season and the league cup.

In 2019, a year after the women's team, the club entered a team in the men's division the Première Ligue de soccer du Québec, a Division III league,  with Sandro Grande becoming the men's head coach. They played their first match on May 4 against FC Gatineau winning 3–2. They finished in sixth place out of nine teams in their inaugural season In 2020, Antoine Katako, formerly the coach of CS Fabrose took over as head coach, replacing interim coach David Cerasuolo, who took over following the departure of head coach Sandro Grande as well as technical director Marco Masucci late in the season, who took a position with the Quebec Soccer Federation.

AS Laval
In late 2021, CS Monteuil merged with CS Étoiles de l’Est to form a new club in later 2021 known as AS Laval (initially a third club, CS Centre-Sud, was to be part of the merger, but they later pulled out). In 2022, the women's team finished second in the league, qualifying them for the inaugural League1 Canada Interprovincial Championship, where they finished in second place, after defeating League1 Ontario side Alliance United FC in a penalty shootout in the semi-finals, before losing to PLSQ champions AS Blainville in the finals.

Seasons

Men
as CS Monteuil

as AS Laval

Women
as CS Monteuil

as AS Laval

Notable former players
 Stefani Kouzas
 Amy Pietrangelo

References

Soccer clubs in Quebec
Laval
Association football clubs established in 1966
1966 establishments in Quebec